Lindsay Davenport was the defending champion, but lost in the final against Venus Williams in their third consecutive final at this tournament. The score was 6–1, 6–4.

Seeds
The first four seeds received a bye into the second round.

Draw

Finals

Top half

Bottom half

References

External links
 Official results archive (ITF)
 Official results archive (WTA)

Singles
Bank of the West Classic - Singles